Bill Behrens (born June 26, 1970) is a former professional tennis player from the United States.

Biography
Behrens, who was born in Pasadena, played for four years at the University of California, Los Angeles before turning professional. He was an NCAA All-American in 1992.

His only title on the ATP World Tour came in the doubles event at St. Pölten in 1992, as an unseeded pairing with Matt Lucena. With the same partner he also finished runner-up in Atlanta in 1996. It was in doubles that he attained his highest ranking, 72 in the world. In singles he made it to 226 in the world and was a finalist in a Challenger tournament in Birmingham, Alabama in 1996, with wins over top 100 players Michael Joyce and Nicolas Lapentti.

Behrens competed in the main draw of the men's doubles events at six Grand Slam tournaments across 1996 and 1997. In the 1997 Wimbledon Championships he had his best result when he reached the third round, with South African Chris Haggard. He and partner Patrick McEnroe had an opening round win over the eighth seeds Pat Galbraith and Ellis Ferreira at the 1997 US Open, before making a second round exit.

He works as a tennis coach in Murrieta, California.

ATP career finals

Doubles: 2 (1–1)

Challenger titles

Doubles: (5)

References

External links
 
 

1970 births
Living people
American male tennis players
Tennis people from California
UCLA Bruins men's tennis players